Gary Whelan (born 1953) is an Irish actor, known for his work on British television.

Early life
Whelan was born in Ireland but he relocated to London when he was ten years old. He then attended Holloway School.

Acting
He has portrayed several roles in the police force. He has twice featured in the BBC soap opera EastEnders, once as DS Terry Rich from 1985 to 1987, and later as DS Paul Kemmit in the spin-off EastEnders: Perfectly Frank in 2003. He played DS Terry Amson in Prime Suspect with Helen Mirren in 1991, D.I Kent in Brookside, D.I. Harry Haines in the ITV drama, The Bill in 1992–1995, and he also played a policeman in the 1991 film Bernard and the Genie, among others.

He also played Brendan Kearney, the village schoolmaster in Ballykissangel (1996–2001), and Danny Parsons, the unscrupulous (fictional) manager of pop group S Club 7 in their debut TV series Miami 7 (1999).

On stage Whelan has played Horatio in Hamlet and Salisbury in Richard II. He has also appeared in two of the Pink Panther movies and his other film credits include Cry Freedom, Paper Marriage, Moll Flanders and Michael Collins. Recent film roles were O'Connor in Villa of Roses and Declan Murphy in A Flight of Fancy.

Among Whelan's other television credits are Glenroe, Angels, Hideaway, Minder, The Royal and Kavanagh QC. Gary has also been seen in the roles of Sam Tilley in Uncle Silas and Charlie Pearch in In Deep. In 2005 he appeared in the BBC hospital drama Casualty@Holby City and in 2006 he starred in Channel 4's Goldplated.

Personal life
Whelan's wife is named Gabrielle and they have five children: Jamie-Jo, Harry, Ella, Finnbar and Molly.

Whelan lived in Brighton and owned its popular Lion & Lobster pub from 2001 until 2014 when he sold it to a pub chain for £4.5 million and moved to Dublin.

He currently owns the Walrus pub in Brighton and the Dalkey Duck pub in Dublin.

Filmography

References

External links

1953 births
Irish male film actors
Irish male stage actors
Irish male soap opera actors
Irish male television actors
Living people
People educated at Holloway School
Alumni of RADA
People from County Dublin
People from Steyning